John Hennings (c. 1833 – 13 October 1898) was a theatrical scene painter and theatre manager in Melbourne, Australia.

He has been identified as Johann Friederich Hennings, probably born on 6 July 1835, son of Danish-born parents Johann Hennings, merchant, and his wife Caroline, née Schutze. His mother died 22 March 1894.

History
Hennings was born in Bremen, of Danish extraction, He learned to paint in the studio of a decorative artist and received further artistic training in Düsseldorf and Vienna. He arrived in Australia in 1855 contracted to George Coppin for his new Olympic Theatre on Lonsdale Street, Melbourne, and soon was transferred to his Theatre Royal, later worked in other playhouses.
He illustrated curtains, backdrops and scenery, notably architectural settings, for the great theatre managers of the age: Barry Sullivan, G. V. Brooke, and W. S. Lyster and productions from opera to vaudeville, from Shakespeare to melodrama.
In those days opera was hugely popular, and the likes of L'Africaine, Semiramide and Don Giovanni were made all the more "grand" by his illustrations — his name as scenic artist was often prominent in advertisements for the production.
He was, with George A. Appleton (brother of actor F. C. Appleton) responsible for the transparencies that greeted the Duke of Edinburgh on his 1867 visit to Victoria.

Like his contemporary W. J. Wilson, who left Melbourne for Sydney in 1861, he was an all-round designer and artist, and like Wilson he became involved in theatre management: in 1867 he joined in partnership with Harwood and Stewart leasing the original Theatre Royal, and with Vincent, Harwood and Stewart, then with Greville and Coppin in its successors. He quit management in later years but his hand and fertile mind remained productive to the end.

Contemporary scene painters include Harry Holmes (who also tried his hand at theatre management). Harry Grist, Alfred Clint (son of marine painter Alfred Clint), George Gordon and Phil Goatcher.

His end came in early October 1898, when he contracted pneumonia and died at home, 40 Victoria Avenue, Albert Park, and his remains were buried at the Melbourne General Cemetery.

Personal
Hennings married Ellen "Nellie" Targett (c. 1836 – 25 March 1915) and had two married daughters
Frances "Fanny" Hennings (1858 – 5 December 1904) married Hans Phillips on 27 August 1878.
Kitty Hennings (1863–1904) was an accomplished pianist.

He also had a son, scenic artist John Henry Hennings (1867–1959), by his mistress Elizabeth Collins (died 1888).

References 

19th-century Australian painters
Australian theatre managers and producers
Australian scenic designers
1833 births
1898 deaths